The Union of European Football Associations (UEFA) is the administrative and controlling body for European football. It consists of 55 member associations, each of which is responsible for governing football in their respective countries.

All widely recognised sovereign states located entirely within Europe are members, with the exceptions of the United Kingdom, Monaco, and Vatican City. Eight states partially or entirely outside Europe are also members: Armenia, Azerbaijan, Russia, Georgia, Kazakhstan, Israel, Cyprus and Turkey. The United Kingdom is divided into the four separate football associations of England, Northern Ireland, Scotland, and Wales; each association has a separate UEFA membership. The Faroe Islands, an autonomous country of the Kingdom of Denmark, also has its own football association which is a member of UEFA. The football association of Gibraltar, a British Overseas Territory, was approved as a member by UEFA in 2013. Kosovo was approved as a member in 2016, even though it is claimed by Serbia and is not recognised by several other UEFA member states.

Each UEFA member has its own football league system, except Liechtenstein. Clubs playing in each top-level league compete for the title as the country's club champions. Clubs also compete in the league and national cup competitions for places in the following season's UEFA club competitions, the UEFA Champions League and UEFA Europa League. Due to promotion and relegation, the clubs playing in the top-level league are different every season, except in San Marino where there is only one level.

Some clubs play in a national football league other than their own country's. Where this is the case the club is noted as such.

Albania 

 Football association: Football Association of Albania
 Second-level league: 2021–22 Albanian First Division

Source:

Andorra

 Country: Andorra
 Football association: Andorran Football Federation
 Second-level league:2021–22 Segona Divisió

Armenia
Main article: List of football clubs in Armenia

 Country: Armenia
 Football association: Football Federation of Armenia
 Second-level league:2021–22 Armenian First League

Azerbaijan
Main article: List of football clubs in Azerbaijan

 Country: Azerbaijan
 Football association: Association of Football Federations of Azerbaijan
 Second-level league:Azerbaijan First Division

Belarus
Main article: List of football clubs in Belarus

 Country: Belarus
 Football association: Football Federation of Belarus
 Second-level league: 2022 Belarusian First League

Belgium 

Main article: List of football clubs in Belgium

 Country: Belgium
 Football association: Royal Belgian Football Association
 Second-level league: 2022–23 Belgian First Division B

Bosnia and Herzegovina 
Main article: List of football clubs in Bosnia and Herzegovina

 Country: Bosnia and Herzegovina
 Football association: Football Association of Bosnia and Herzegovina
 Second-level league:First League of the Federation of Bosnia and Herzegovina and First League of the Republika Srpska

Bulgaria 
Main article: List of football clubs in Bulgaria

 Country: Bulgaria
 Football association: Bulgarian Football Union
 Second-level league:2017–18 Second Professional Football League (Bulgaria)

Croatia 
Main article: List of football clubs in Croatia

 Country: Croatia
 Football association: Croatian Football Federation
 Second-level league:Croatian Second Football League
 NK BSK Bijelo Brdo
 GNK Dinamo Zagreb II
 NK Dugopolje
 HNK Hajduk Split II
 NK Hrvatski Dragovoljac
 NK Kustošija
 NK Lučko
 NK Međimurje
 NK Osijek II
 NK Sesvete
 NK Solin
 HNK Šibenik
 NK Varaždin
 NK Zadar

Cyprus 
Main article: List of football clubs in Cyprus

 Country: Cyprus
 Football association: Cyprus Football Association
 Second-level league:Cypriot Second Division
The teams which participated in the 2017–18 Cypriot Second Division are:

Czech Republic 
Main article: List of football clubs in the Czech Republic

 Country: Czech Republic
 Football association: Football Association of the Czech Republic
 Second-level league:Czech National Football League
The following 16 clubs were competing in the 2018–19 Czech National Football League.

Denmark 
Main articles: List of football clubs in Denmark and List of football clubs in Denmark by league

 Country: Denmark
 Football association: Danish Football Association
 Second-level league:Danish 1st Division

Locations of the 2017-18 Danish 1st Division teams.

England 
Main article: List of football clubs in England

 Country: England
 Football association: The Football Association
 Second-level league: EFL Championship 

The following 24 clubs are competing in the Championship during the 2018–19 EFL Championship season.

Estonia 
Main article: List of football clubs in Estonia

 Country: Estonia
 Football association: Estonian Football Association
 Second-level league: Esiliiga

Faroe Islands 
Main article: List of football clubs in Faroe Islands

 Country: Faroe Islands
 Football association: Faroe Islands Football Association
 Second-level league: 1. deild

The bottom two teams from the 2016 season, B68 Toftir and AB,  were relegated to the 2017 1. deild. They were replaced by EB/Streymur and 07 Vestur, champions and runners-up of the 2016 1. deild respectively.

Source: Scoresway

Finland 
Main article: List of football clubs in Finland

 Country: Finland
 Football association: Football Association of Finland
 Second-level league:Ykkönen

The clubs in the 2018 Ykkönen season are:

France 
Main article: List of football clubs in France

 Country: France
 Football association: French Football Federation
 Second-level league: Ligue 2

 1 Bourg-Péronnas original stadium, Stade Municipal de Péronnas, is not homologated to host professional matches. The club are playing their home games at Stade Marcel-Verchère, home stadium of Bourg-en-Bresse professional rugby union team, after the stadium's renovation. Bourg-Péronnas will play its first games at Stade Jean Laville in Gueugnon.

Georgia 
Main article: List of football clubs in Georgia

 Country: Georgia
 Football association: Georgian Football Federation
 Second-level league:Erovnuli Liga 2
The clubs for 2017 Erovnuli Liga 2 are-

Source: Scoresway

Germany 
Main article: List of football clubs in Germany

 Country: Germany
 Football association: German Football Association
 Second-level league: 2. Bundesliga

Gibraltar 
Main article: List of football clubs in Gibraltar

 Country: Gibraltar
 Football association: Gibraltar Football Association
 Second-level league:Gibraltar Second Division

Greece 
Main article: List of football clubs in Greece

 Country: Greece
 Football association: Hellenic Football Federation
 Second-level league:Football League

The following 16 clubs are competing in the Football League during the 2018–19 season.

Hungary 
Main article: List of football clubs in Hungary

 Country: Hungary
 Football association: Hungarian Football Federation
 Second-level league:Nemzeti Bajnokság II
Following is the list of clubs competing in 2017–18 Nemzeti Bajnokság II.

Iceland 
Main article: List of football clubs in Iceland

 Country: Iceland
 Football association: Football Association of Iceland (Icelandic: Knattspyrnusamband Íslands)
 Second-level league:1. deild karla

Israel 
Main article: List of football clubs in Israel

 Country: Israel
 Football association: Israel Football Association
 Second-level league:Liga Leumit

The club is playing their home games at a neutral venue because their own ground does not meet league requirements.

Italy 
Main article: List of football clubs in Italy

 Country: Italy
 Football association: Federazione Italiana Giuoco Calcio
 Second-level league:Serie B

Kazakhstan 
Main article: List of football clubs in Kazakhstan

 Country: Kazakhstan
 Football association: Football Union of Kazakhstan
 Second-level league:Kazakhstan First Division

Kosovo 
Main article: List of football clubs in Kosovo

 Country: Kosovo
 Football association: Football Federation of Kosovo
 Second-level league:First Football League of Kosovo

Latvia 
Main article: List of football clubs in Latvia

 Country: Latvia
 Football association: Latvian Football Federation
 Second-level league:Latvian First League
12 clubs are taking part in the 2018 First League season.

 Balvu Sporta centrs
 BFC Daugavpils/Progress
 FK Auda
 FK Smiltene/BJSS
 FK Staiceles Bebri
 FK Tukums 2000/TSS
 Grobiņas SC
 JDFS Alberts
 Preiļu BJSS
 Rēzeknes FA/BJSS
 RTU FC/Skonto Academy
 SK Super Nova

Lithuania 
Main article: List of football clubs in Lithuania

 Country: Lithuania
 Football association: Lithuanian Football Federation
 Second-level league:I Lyga

Luxembourg 
Main article: List of football clubs in Luxembourg

 Country: Luxembourg
 Football association: Luxembourg Football Federation
 Second-level league:Luxembourg Division of Honour

Malta 
Main article: List of football clubs in Malta

 Country: Malta
 Football association: Malta Football Association
 Second-level league:Maltese First Division

Moldova 
Main article: List of football clubs in Moldova

 Country: Republic of Moldova
 Football association: Football Association of Moldova
 Second-level league:Moldovan "A" Division

Montenegro 
Main article: List of football clubs in Montenegro

 Country: Montenegro
 Football association: Football Association of Montenegro
 Second-level league:Montenegrin Second League

Netherlands 
Main article: List of football clubs in the Netherlands

 Country: Netherlands
 Football association: Royal Dutch Football Association
 Second-level league:Eerste Divisie

Northern Ireland 
Main article: List of football clubs in Northern Ireland

 Country: Northern Ireland
 Football association: Irish Football Association
 Second-level league:NIFL Championship

 since 1985.

Norway 
Main article: List of football clubs in Norway

 Country: Norway
 Football association: Football Association of Norway
 Second-level league:1. divisjon

The following 16 clubs are competing in the OBOS-ligaen during the 2018 season, seven of which are located in Western Norway, six are from Eastern Norway, and one each are from Trøndelag, Southern Norway and north of the Arctic Circle:

Source:

Poland 
Main article: List of football clubs in Poland

 Country: Poland
 Football association: Polish Football Association
 Second-level league:I liga

Portugal 
Main article: List of football clubs in Portugal

 Country: Portugal
 Football association: Portuguese Football Federation
 Top-level league: LigaPro

Republic of Ireland 

 Country: Republic of Ireland
 Football association: Football Association of Ireland
 Second-level league:League of Ireland First Division

Republic of North Macedonia 
Main article: List of football clubs in North Macedonia
 Country: Republic of North Macedonia
 Football association: Football Federation of North Macedonia
 Second-level league:Macedonian Second Football League

East 
Borec
Bregalnica Shtip
Detonit Junior
Kit-Go Pehchevo
Kozhuf
Osogovo
Partizan Obrshani
Plachkovica
Sasa
Tikvesh

West 
Genç Kalemler
Goblen
Gostivar
Labunishta
Korabi
Pelister
Skopje
Struga
Teteks
Vëllazërimi 77

Source: Wikipedia article

Romania 
Main article: List of football clubs in Romania

 Country: Romania
 Football association: Romanian Football Federation
 Second-level league:Liga II

Russia 
Main article: List of football clubs in Russia

 Country: Russia
 Football association: Football Union of Russia
 Second-level league:Russian Football National League
 Armavir
 Avangard Kursk
 Baltika Kaliningrad
 Chertanovo Moscow
 Fakel Voronezh
 Khimki
 Krasnodar-2
 Luch-Energiya
 Mordovia Saransk
 Nizhny Novgorod
 Rotor Volgograd
 Shinnik Yaroslavl
 Sibir Novosibirsk
 SKA-Khabarovsk
 Sochi
 Spartak-2 Moscow
 Tambov
 Tom Tomsk
 Tyumen
 Zenit-2 Saint Petersburg

San Marino 

 Country: San Marino
 Football association: San Marino Football Federation
 Second-level League:NONE

Scotland 
Main article: List of football clubs in Scotland

 Country: Scotland
 Football association: Scottish Football Association
 Second-level league:Scottish Championship

Serbia 
Main article: List of football clubs in Serbia

 Country: Serbia
 Football association: Football Association of Serbia
 Second-level league:Serbian First League

Slovakia 
Main article: List of football clubs in Slovakia

 Country: Slovakia
 Football association: Slovak Football Association
 Second-level league:DOXXbet liga
 Nové Mesto
 Pohronie
 Sereď
 Skalica
 Šamorín
 Žilina B
 Partizán Bardejov
 Lokomotíva Košice
 Liptovský Mikuláš
 Poprad
 Spišská Nová Ves
 Lokomotíva Zvolen
 FK Inter Bratislava
 KFC Komárno
 FK Železiarne Podbrezová B
 FK Slavoj Trebišov

Slovenia 
Main article: List of football clubs in Slovenia

 Country: Slovenia
 Football association: Football Association of Slovenia
 Second-level league:Slovenian Second League

Teams for 2019 season are
 Ankaran Postojna
 Beltinci
 Bilje
 Bravo
 Brda
 Brežice 1919
 Dob
 Drava Ptuj
 Fužinar
 Ilirija 1911
 Jadran Dekani
 Krka
 Nafta 1903
 Radomlje
 Rogaška
 Tabor Sežana

Spain 
Main article: List of football clubs in Spain

 Country: Spain
 Football association: Royal Spanish Football Federation
 Second-level league:Segunda División

Sweden 
Main article: List of football clubs in Sweden

 Country: Sweden
 Football association: Swedish Football Association
 Second-level league:Superettan

 1 Correct as of end of 2017 season

Switzerland 
Main article: List of football clubs in Switzerland

 Country: Switzerland
 Football association: Swiss Football Association
 Second-level league:Swiss Challenge League

Turkey 
Main article: List of football clubs in Turkey

 Country: Turkey
 Football association: Turkish Football Federation
 Second-level league:TFF First League

Ukraine 
Main article: List of football clubs in Ukraine

 Country: Ukraine
 Football association: Football Federation of Ukraine
 Second-level league:Ukrainian First League

Wales 
Main article: List of football clubs in Wales

 Country: Wales
 Football association: Football Association of Wales
 Second-level league:Cymru Alliance and Welsh Football League Division One

Cymru Alliance

Welsh Football League Division One
 Afan Lido
 Briton Ferry Llansawel
 Caerau (Ely)
 Cambrian & Clydach Vale
 Cwmamman United
 Cwmbran Celtic
 Goytre
 Goytre United
 Haverfordwest County
 Llanelli Town
 Monmouth Town
 Pen-y-Bont
 Port Talbot Town
 Taff's Well
 Ton Pentre
 Undy Athletic

See also
 List of top-division football clubs in UEFA countries
 List of top-division football clubs in AFC countries
List of second division football clubs in AFC countries
 List of top-division football clubs in CAF countries
 List of top-division football clubs in CONCACAF countries
 List of top-division football clubs in CONMEBOL countries
 List of top-division football clubs in OFC countries
 List of top-division football clubs in non-FIFA countries

Notes

References

Lists of association football clubs
Association football in Europe